The 1929–30 Serie A season was the fourth season of the Serie A, the top level of ice hockey in Italy. Seven teams participated in the league, and Hockey Club Milano won the championship by defeating GSD Cortina in the final.

Regular season

Group A

Group B

Final-Qualification 
 GSD Cortina - Hockey Club Milano II 2:0

Final
Hockey Club Milano - GSD Cortina 3:0

External links
 Season on hockeytime.net

1929–30 in Italian ice hockey
Serie A (ice hockey) seasons
Italy